The Bergianska trädgården, the Bergian Garden or Hortus Bergianus, is a botanical garden located in the Frescati area on the outskirts of Stockholm, close to the Swedish Museum of Natural History and the main campus of Stockholm University. The director of the garden is known as Professor Bergianus.

History

The Garden was founded through a donation in 1791 by the historian and antiquarian Bengt Bergius and his brother Peter Jonas Bergius, a physician and scientist, for the Royal Swedish Academy of Sciences, and was originally located at their mansion and its adjacent garden on the Karlbergsvägen road, in what is now the Vasastaden district in central Stockholm. which at the time still had a largely rural character. The Garden was donated to the Royal Academy after the brothers' death in 1791, in accordance with their will. The first person to serve as director was Olof Swartz. 

The garden was moved to its current location in 1885, because its original location was slated for construction. Today the garden is owned by the Swedish government and the Royal Swedish Academy of Sciences. It is jointly administered by the Academy of Sciences and Stockholm University.

Professor Bergianus
 1791–1818 Olof Swartz
 1823–1856 Johan Emanuel Wikström
 1857–1879 Nils Johan Andersson
 1879–1914 Veit Brecher Wittrock
 1915–1944 Robert Fries
 1944–1965 Carl Rudolf Florin
 1970–1983 Måns Ryberg (de facto 1966-1983)
 1983–2001 Bengt Jonsell
 2002–current Birgitta Bremer

Pictures

References

External links

 

1791 establishments in Sweden
Botanical gardens in Sweden
Royal Swedish Academy of Sciences
Parks in Stockholm